Irideae is a tribe included in the well-known family Iridaceae. It contains many species in five genera which are widely distributed in the Old World. The tribe derives its name from Iris, which is the largest genus of the tribe.

The blooms, which are often with scent and collected in an inflorescence, have six petals. Those are identical only in the genus Ferraria. The ovary is 3-locular and contains seeds which are usually circular and pellet-like. The members has the typical sword-shaped leaves and the rootstock is usually rhizome or corm. Only two subgenera of Iris have bulbs. These are Xiphium and Hermodactyloides.

Many of the species are popular ornamental plants, but many are threatened with extinction.

List of genera:

 Bobartia
 Dietes
 Ferraria
 Iris
 Moraea

References

Iridaceae
Asparagales tribes